Anomoloma is a genus of crust fungi in the family Amylocorticiaceae. It was circumscribed by mycologists Tuomo Niemelä and Karl-Henrik Larsson in 2007. The generic name is derived from the Greek anomos, meaning "lawless", which in this context alludes to the irregular rhizomorphic outline, and loma, meaning margin or edge.

References

External links

Amylocorticiales